Anartia is a genus of butterflies in family Nymphalidae, and subfamily Nymphalinae, found in tropical and subtropical areas in the Americas.  The butterflies are known as peacocks, although the common European peacock (Aglais io) is not in the same genus.

Species 
Listed alphabetically.

References

External links 

 
Nymphalidae of South America
Butterfly genera
Taxa named by Jacob Hübner